Frederic King (3 January 1853 – 20 May 1933) was a baritone best known for his performances in the works composed by Arthur Sullivan for the Leeds Festivals of 1880 and 1886.  Later, he taught singing for 42 years at the Royal College of Music.

Early life and concert career
Born in Lichfield, the son of Thomas and Mary King, Frederic King was baptised on 13 January 1853 at St Michael's church in Lichfield. He worked in an auction house before joining the concert agents Messrs Harrison. He made his professional debut in a ballad concert at St James's Hall in 1878 and launched a successful career as a platform singer in baritone roles. He married Eva Hume (born 1863) in London in 1882, and they had two children, Mary Eva Oakley King (1883–1955) and Ernest Archibald Frederic King (1888–1973).

King created the role of Callias, the Priest of Apollo, in the first performance of Arthur Sullivan's oratorio The Martyr of Antioch at the triennial Leeds Festivals in 1880. He sang the role of Mephistopheles in the English premiere of Berlioz's La damnation de Faust at the Royal Albert Hall in 1882. In 1886, at Leeds, he sang the role of Lucifer in the first performance of Sullivan's cantata The Golden Legend (1886).

Reviewing King's performance in the latter work, Herman Klein, in Musical Notes, called him:
...a talented and conscientious artist, who invested his music with all the dramatic significance and sardonic humour of which it was susceptible. Truth to tell, there is not much diabolical in Longfellow's fiend, and it would seem as though Sir Arthur Sullivan had sought on occasion to atone for his comparative mildness by applying a background of orchestration worthy in its sonority of Berlioz or Wagner. Whether Satan could make himself heard in Pandemonium may be an open question, but undoubtedly there are moments in The Golden Legend when Lucifer's human representative, be his voice ever so stentorian, is bound to be inaudible. All that artistic singing could do to lend the character its proper prominence was done by Mr. King.

Later years
On retiring from the concert platform King taught singing at the Royal College of Music for 42 years, from 1889 to 1931. Among his students were Norman Allin, Miriam Licette, Robert Radford, David Brazell, William Samuell and Herbert Heyner. After his retirement from the Royal Academy of Music he continued to give lessons privately, the last being just before he was taken ill a week before his death.

King died in May 1933 aged 80 at his home in Hampstead after a short illness. His funeral service took place at Golders Green Crematorium on 22 May 1933. He was survived by his widow, Eva King, and his children, Mrs Mary Eva Oakley Turier and Ernest Archibald Frederic King. In his will he left them £1,375.

References

1853 births
1933 deaths
People from Lichfield
English operatic baritones
Golders Green Crematorium
People associated with Gilbert and Sullivan